Anthony James Jude Villegas Arias, better known for his stage name Junji Arias, is a Filipino record producer, composer, singer, and was the former vocalist and chief songwriter for the band, Excerpts (1993–1999) and Velcro (1999–2008). Arias has been well known for his raw, sharp-edged raspy vocals.  He was one of the pioneers of the acoustic Rock alternative scene during the late 1990s and early 2000s.   He is also musically versatile, playing a wide range of instruments, including the guitar, keyboards, and several percussion instruments.

Arias auditioned for the first season of The Voice of the Philippines where he was able to join Sarah Geronimo's team. He was able to go to reach the team's final 6 before getting eliminated.

Background
Arias was born on August 5, 1976 in Makati, Philippines to Ariel Jose Bacerdo Arias and Redenta Nazareth Villegas. He is the nephew of renowned author, curator, jeweller, antiquities dealer and poet, Ramon Villegas. He started his education at Colegio San Agustin-Makati, but got into a lot of trouble growing up and went on to different high schools to finish, then to college at International Academy of Management and Economics, taking up a degree majoring in Management and Economics.

He is married to French model and financial advisor, Anais Arias.

Career

Beginnings and early success
He began his singing career as a solo act, at the age of 17, at Ka Freddies in Tagaytay in 1993 after being discovered by international folk star, Freddie Aguilar. He released his first album under Warner Music Philippines with the band Excerpts in 1999. In 2000, he formed Velcro, an acoustic group together with Rivermaya drummer, Mark Escueta, and coExcerpts member and lead guitarist, James Diaz. They were later joined by Bolichie Suzara on Bass and Alex Fidel on Drums for their debut album, "Ubod ng Lakas na Dikoryenteng Kombo" released in 2004 and was distributed by Viva Records.

He was also able to collaborate with different artists, including Rachel Alejandro, Rico Blanco, Jay Durias, and Top Suzara. He composed, arranged and co-produced Geneva Cruz's album, "To Manila", which was released October 2013. He also composed jingles for different commercial ads.

In 2007, he released his single "98 Seconds" in (Germany) and China.

The Voice of the Philippines
In June 2013, he joined The Voice of the Philippines wherein he sang "I'll Be There for You" by Bon Jovi. He was able to make Lea Salonga, Bamboo Mañalac, and Sarah Geronimo turn their respective chairs. He later picked the latter as his coach. During the Battles, he was paired up with the 22-year-old Dave Jonathan Lamar where they sang "Bohemian Rhapsody." Arias later won that round and which made him advanced to the Live shows. In the first Live show, he sang Aerosmith's "I Don't Want to Miss a Thing while suffering from mononucleosis." He was later eliminated after Geronimo picked Eva delos Santos over him.

Post The Voice of the Philippines
After ending his stint in The Voice of the Philippines, Arias continued his career in doing musical gigs at both local and international venues.  Until 2015, he decided to focus on his business ventures and fatherhood. In 2022, he wrote and produced Geneva Cruz comeback single, "Sinungaling" and co-wrote carrier single of pop duo, Suzara, entitled  "Kakalimutan".

Discography

With Excerpts
 Sunday Jam sa Tagaytay
 Una

With Velcro
 Ubod ng Lakas na Dikoryenteng Kombo
 Close Up
 Ubod ng Lumpiya na may Sauce Maryosep

Solo albums
 98 Seconds
 Six Pack Blues

Collaborations
 Hearts Desire (album) (with Rachel Alejandro)
 To Manila (album) (with Geneva Cruz)
 ''Sinungaling' (with Geneva Cruz)

References

External links
 
 

1976 births
Living people
Filipino rock singers
Filipino singer-songwriters
Singers from Makati
Star Magic personalities
The Voice of the Philippines contestants
21st-century Filipino singers